Ufacık is a village in the Şahinbey District, Gaziantep Province, Turkey. The village is inhabited by Turkmens and had a population of  147 in 2022.

References

Villages in Şahinbey District